The 1920 Copa Ibarguren was the 8h. edition of this national cup of Argentina. It was played by the champions of both leagues, Boca Juniors (Primera División of dissident league Asociación Amateurs de Football), and Tiro Federal (Liga Rosarina de Football), crowned during 1920.

After the first match (where Boca Juniors had won 2–1) was annulled, Tiro Federal beat Boca Juniors 4–0 in the replay match at Boca Juniors Stadium.

Qualified teams

Overview 

Boca Juniors beat Tiro Federal 2–1 in the final held in Sportivo Barracas. However, the Liga Rosarina claimed that three Boca Juniors footballers had played for other teams during that season (which was forbidden). Players pointed were Américo Tesoriere (for Sportivo del Norte), Felipe Galíndez (for Sportivo Barracas), and Marcelino Martínez (for Vélez Sarsfield).

On August 24, the Association decided that the score stood, proclaiming Boca Juniors as winner. Nevertheless, the Martínez case was still in doubt. Finally, in October 1921 both clubs agreed to replay the match. The Association accept that gentleman's agreement.

Match details

Final

Rematch

References 

Boca Juniors matches
1920 in Argentine football
1920 in South American football